Tighina Fortress (renamed by the Turks as Bender) is a 15th-century fortress on the right bank of the Dniester River in Bender, Moldova, built from earth and wood during the reign of Prince Stephen the Great. In 1538 it was conquered by the Turkish sultan Suleiman the Magnificent, who ordered it to be rebuilt in stone and enlarged.

History 
The earliest mention of Tighina, as a settlement and customs post, is found in the commercial privilege granted on October 6, 1408, by the Prince of Moldavia Alexander the Good to the merchants of Lviv. Later, throughout the 15th and 16th centuries, the name of Tighina is frequently recorded in medieval documents. In the Moldavian documents that mention the locality, in Tighina, along with the royal customs and the crossing, a guard is mentioned. In the only document from the Prince Stephen the Great (1457-1504) in which Tighina appears, the guard is also mentioned.

As for the fortress of Tighina, 19th-century researchers, following the information circulating in previous centuries, accredited the idea that it was built in the 12th century by the Genoese, as well as Hotin and Cetatea Albă fortresses. The military historian Aleksander Zaschuk saw in the architecture of the inner citadel a pronounced western character. The first and only definite mention of the existence of the Moldavian fortification itself, of the fortress (probably of wood and earth), is found in the Moldavian-Polish Chronicle from the middle of the 16th century. It relates, referring to the Ottoman conquests of 1538, that the Turkish sultan Süleyman "took possession of the Moldavian fortress Tighina."

Archaeological investigations of limited extent, carried out by the researcher Ion Hîncu in 1969, allowed the discovery of housing complexes and a defense ditch belonging to the 15th-16th centuries. Archaeological excavations have led to the identification of a fortification, probably of wood and earth, which preceded the later stone construction. The surface of the fortress' courtyard of circular or ovoid shape was covered with a layer of ashes. Ceramic and metal objects bear traces of fire.

The fortress, having been rebuilt by Petru Rareș and conquered in 1538 by the Turkish sultan Soliman the Magnificent, became the residence of the Turkish raya. Its old name was replaced by a new one, Bender, meaning "river port, berth". During this period, Soliman I ordered that the fortress be rebuilt in stone and enlarged according to the design of the architect Sinan, the reconstruction works being completed only in 1541.

Using local resources and the work of the local peasants, the Ottomans turned the fortress into a well-established fighting outpost. At that time the fortress built of stone was a quadrangle surrounded on three sides by a very deep ditch.

By the end of the 16th century, Moldavian detachments had attacked the Bender fortress several times, but without any success. In the summer of 1574, John the Brave had besieged it with his army. Then in 1595 and 1600 Michael the Brave had made two attempts, but neither of the two rulers had any success. Around the same time, Bender was attacked by the Zaporozhian Cossacks. In the years 1705-1707 the works of strengthening this fortification of special military importance on behalf of Turks were continued by the prince Antioh Cantemir. In this last variant, the fortress consisted of an ensemble of 10 bastions and 11 towers surrounded by the same traditional defense ditch.

The bitter fate of the fortress ruled by the Turks made the chronicler Miron Costin write that "the fortress of Tighina has darkened". As a result of the three Russo-Turkish wars, it came under the rule of the Russian Empire, the Tsarist generals finding it very suitable for military barracks. From 1812 or rather from the second half of the 19th century, the fortress of Bender gradually began to lose its former strategic importance.

Since 1991, the fortress has been under the control of the Transnistrian separatist regime, which restored it between 2008 and 2012.

Gallery

2021

2013

Before 2013

References

External links
 Casamare.md: Cetatea Tighina

Castles in Moldova
Bender, Moldova